Percy Newton (21 December 1880 – 25 April 1946) was an Australian cricketer. He played two first-class matches for New South Wales in 1907/08.

See also
 List of New South Wales representative cricketers

References

External links
 

1880 births
1946 deaths
Australian cricketers
New South Wales cricketers
Cricketers from Sydney